Bluebox Limited Films is a production company and film distributor founded by Scott Beck and Bryan Woods. The company's  founders were among the top 50 in the Director's competition of Project Greenlight. The pair secured a deal with MTV Films after winning MTVU's Best Film on Campus competition with their feature University Heights.

Films
 University Heights (2004)
 Her Summer (2004)
 The Bride Wore Blood (2006)
 Impulse (2010)

Television
 Spread (2012) (Pilot)

Music videos
 "Self Indulgent Feeling", Vanaprasta (2012)

References

External links
 Bluebox Films

Film production companies of the United States
Companies based in Iowa